Borowa may refer to 
Various places in Poland:
Borowa, Lower Silesian Voivodeship (south-west Poland)
Borowa, Bełchatów County in Łódź Voivodeship (central Poland)
Borowa, Łódź East County in Łódź Voivodeship (central Poland)
Borowa, Piotrków County in Łódź Voivodeship (central Poland)
Borowa, Gmina Dobryszyce in Łódź Voivodeship (central Poland)
Borowa, Gmina Gidle in Łódź Voivodeship (central Poland)
Borowa, Gmina Przedbórz in Łódź Voivodeship (central Poland)
Borowa, Lublin Voivodeship (east Poland)
Borowa, Lesser Poland Voivodeship (south Poland)
Borowa, Dębica County in Subcarpathian Voivodeship (south-east Poland)
Borowa, Mielec County in Subcarpathian Voivodeship (south-east Poland)
Borowa, Silesian Voivodeship (south Poland)
The Borowa people, a clan of the Cubeo descended from the "Maku"